Len Casey is a rugby league footballer.

Len or Leonard Casey may also refer to:

Len Casey (footballer) 
Len Casey (TV producer) in The C.G.E. Show
Leonard Casey, character played by Geoffrey Bayldon